The Rock Island Arsenal Museum in Rock Island County, Illinois is based around the history of Rock Island Arsenal. It is the second oldest museum of the United States Army, the oldest being the Museum at West Point.

History
There have been two museum locations. It was first founded in 1905 as the Ordnance Museum, later shutting down during World War I and reopening a few years later. It was renamed in 1919 to the Rock Island Arsenal Museum. The now renamed museum moved to a different location in 1948.

Collection
The original museum was opened with donations from the 1904 World's Fair and the American Civil War ordnance warehouse. The exhibits are about the people in Arsenal Island's history, its manufacturing processes, and the equipment it has produced. There is a large display of more than 1,100 firearms that were used by the military, both from overseas or within the United States. Five of these weapons were used at the Battle of the Little Bighorn. Twenty-five percent of the collection's small firearms are not on display, including three rare rifles. Jodean Murdock, education curator, says that the firearms get the most attention from visitors.

The museum has a research center located in its basement, containing books, maps, manuals, and magazines, among others. A Children's Discovery Room was created with uniforms and hats for children to try on. Hygrothermographs and a thermostat are used to control the temperature and humidity in the collection rooms so that the items contained within them are not damaged.

The museum collections were reduced in 2016, with almost 3,200 pieces being moved to a warehouse operated by the Army. There was also a large reduction in staff. The museum's gift shop went out of business as well due to falling sales.

References

External links
Official website

Tourist attractions in Rock Island, Illinois
United States Army museums
Museums in Rock Island County, Illinois
Museums established in 1905
1905 establishments in Illinois